She Rocks, Vol. 1: A Collection of Kick-Ass Guitar Goddesses is a 2017 compilation album featuring female rock guitarists, released by Favored Nations Entertainment on January 20, 2017. The album was produced by Brad Tolinski and Steve Vai. The cover art was designed by Laura B. Whitmore.

Track listing
 Orianthi – "Transmogrify"
 Yasi Hofer – "Cosmic Stars"
 Kat Dyson – "U Know What I Like"
 Sarah Longfield – "The Taxi Time Travel Task Force"
 Lita Ford w/ Lez Zeppelin – "The Lemon Song"
 Jennifer Batten – "In the Aftermath"
 Nita Strauss – "Pandemonium"
 Steph Paynes – "The Sun at Her Eastern Gate"
 Nili Brosh – "A Matter of Perception"
 Gretchen Menn – "Scrap Metal"
 Yvette Young – "Hydra

See also
 Women in rock

References

2017 compilation albums
Favored Nations compilation albums
Women in music
Rock compilation albums